Atelopteryx is a genus of beetles in the family Cerambycidae, containing a single species, Atelopteryx compsoceroides. It was described by Lecordaire in 1869 and is endemic to Brazil.

References

Necydalinae
Beetles described in 1869
Endemic fauna of Brazil
Monotypic Cerambycidae genera